Ianos or IANOS may refer to:

 IANOS, a Greek bookstore chain
 Cyclone Ianos, a 2020 Mediterranean cyclone

People with the given name
 Ianoș Brînză (born 1998), Moldovan football player
 Ianos Kovacs (born 1945), Romanian boxer